Purple Haze 2 is the seventh studio album by American rapper Cam'ron. This is his first album in 10 years. It was released on December 20, 2019 via Killa Entertainment and Cinematic Music Group. It serves as a sequel to his 2004 album Purple Haze and features guest appearances from Max B, Mimi Faust, Disco Black, Jim Jones, Shoota93 and Wale. The album peaked at number 180 on the Billboard 200 in the United States. The album received positive reviews from the music publications that did review it, though it was mostly overlooked by music critics.

Track listing
Credits adapted from Tidal.

Personnel
Nik Hotchkiss – mixing & mastering
Vaughn "REK" Beck – mixing & mastering
Pencil Fingerz - album cover design

Reception

Charts

References

2019 albums
Cam'ron albums
Sequel albums
Albums produced by the Heatmakerz